Anti-authoritarianism is opposition to authoritarianism, which is defined as "a form of social organisation characterised by submission to authority", "favoring complete obedience or subjection to authority as opposed to individual freedom" and to authoritarian government. Anti-authoritarians usually believe in full equality before the law and strong civil liberties. Sometimes the term is used interchangeably with anarchism, an ideology which entails opposing authority or hierarchical organization in the conduct of human relations, including the state system.

Views and practice 
Freethought is a philosophical viewpoint that holds opinions should be formed on the basis of logic, reason and empiricism, rather than authority, tradition, or other dogmas. The cognitive application of freethought is known as "freethinking" and practitioners of freethought are known as "freethinkers".

Argument from authority is a common form of argument which leads to a logical fallacy when misused. In informal reasoning, the appeal to authority is a form of argument attempting to establish a statistical syllogism. The appeal to authority relies on an argument of the form:
 A is an authority on a particular topic
 A makes a statement about that topic
 A is therefore correct

Fallacious examples of using the appeal include any appeal to authority used in the context of logical reasoning and appealing to the position of an authority or authorities to dismiss evidence as while authorities can be correct in judgments related to their area of expertise more often than laypersons, they can still come to the wrong judgments through error, bias, dishonesty, or falling prey to groupthink. Thus, the appeal to authority is not a generally reliable argument for establishing facts. Influential anarchist Mikhail Bakunin thought the following: "Does it follow that I reject all authority? Far from me such a thought. In the matter of boots, I refer to the authority of the bootmaker; concerning houses, canals, or railroads, I consult that of the architect or the engineer. For such or such special knowledge I apply to such or such a savant. But I allow neither the bootmaker nor the architect nor savant to impose his authority upon me. I listen to them freely and with all the respect merited by their intelligence, their character, their knowledge, reserving always my incontestable right of criticism and censure. I do not content myself with consulting a single authority in any special branch; I consult several; I compare their opinions, and choose that which seems to me the soundest. But I recognise no infallible authority, even in special questions; consequently, whatever respect I may have for the honesty and the sincerity of such or such individual, I have no absolute faith in any person". He saw that "there is no fixed and constant authority, but a continual exchange of mutual, temporary, and, above all, voluntary authority and subordination. This same reason forbids me, then, to recognise a fixed, constant and universal authority, because there is no universal man, no man capable of grasping in all that wealth of detail, without which the application of science to life is impossible, all the sciences, all the branches of social life".

After World War II, there was a strong sense of anti-authoritarianism based on anti-fascism in Europe. This was attributed to the active resistance from occupation and to fears arising from the development of superpowers. Anti-authoritarianism has also been associated with countercultural and bohemian movements. In the 1950s, the Beat Generation were politically radical and to some degree their anti-authoritarian attitudes were taken up by activists in the 1960s. The hippie and larger counterculture movements of the 1960s carried out a way of life and activism which was ideally carried through anti-authoritarian and non-violent means. It was observed as such: "The way of the hippie is antithetical to all repressive hierarchical power structures since they are adverse to the hippie goals of peace, love and freedom... Hippies don't impose their beliefs on others. Instead, hippies seek to change the world through reason and by living what they believe." In the 1970s, anti-authoritarianism became associated with the punk subculture.

See also 
 Anticonformism
 Civil libertarianism
 Fascist (insult)
 Freedom of speech
 Green Mountain Anarchist Collective
 Individualism
 Libertarianism
 Libertarian socialism
 Question authority

References 

Authoritarianism
Political movements
Political theories
Anarchist theory
Authority
Anti-fascism